Home of Astronauts is a 7" vinyl-only covers EP released by Indiana lo-fi/indie songster Elephant Micah. It was released in October 2004 on Third Uncle Records. Early copies of the EP came with a burned CD of the record, along with eight live tracks, including versions of "Big Star", "Nobody Knows, Rosie", and "Soberer", which would later be released in studio form on the Tropical Depression EP.

Track listing

Side A
"Bits" (Snatchclaws)
"Damn I Wish I Was Your Lover" (Sophie B. Hawkins)

Side B
"Purr Snickety" (Smashing Pumpkins)
"Willing" (Little Feat)

Limited CD-R track listing
"Bits"
"Damn, I Wish I Was Your Lover"
"Purr Snickety"
"Willing"
"Rockin' Teeny Death Slide" (Live)
"Bible Birds" (Live)
"The Story Of My Expatriate Friends" (Live)
"Big Star" (Live)
"Nobody Knows, Rosie" (Live)
"It's Music" (Live)
"Daniel's Song" (Live)
"Soberer" (Live)

Elephant Micah albums
2004 EPs
Covers EPs